Melungtse (Chinese: 门隆则峰; ; Chinese: 乔格茹峰, Pinyin: Qiáogérú Fēng; other English spelling: Menlungtse) is the highest mountain of the Rolwaling Himal in the Himalayas.

The peak has a long summit ridge capped by the east (main) summit and the west summit, also known as Melungtse II, 7,023m. The mountain's steep faces make it more difficult than its elevation would suggest.

Location

Melungtse lies just north of the Nepal–China border, on a western spur ridge coming out of the main north-south trending ridge of the Rolwaling Himal, in Tingri County, Shigatse Prefecture of Tibet. To the southwest, across the Menlung Chu, lies Gauri Sankar, which, though a bit lower (7134 m), is much more visible from Nepal, hence better-known. Melungtse lies about 40 km west of Mount Everest.

Climbing history
Melungtse was off limits to climbing until quite recently. The first attempt was made in Oct 1982 when Bill Denz made a strictly illegal attempt on the southeast ridge, after sneaking over the border from Nepal's Rolwaling Valley. However he turned back while still low on the route. In  1987 and 1988 Chris Bonington led two expeditions, with the second one succeeding in putting Andy Fanshawe and Alan Hinkes on the west summit, but did not climb the main summit.   Another attempt in 1990, this time on the East Ridge of the main summit, failed well below the top.

The first ascent of the main peak came in 1992. Slovenians Marko Prezelj and Andrej Stremfelj ascended the dangerous, 2000m southeast face in less than two and a half days up and down.

The Himalayan Index lists only one other attempt on Melungtse, a failed attempt via the North Face in 1999.

References

Sources
 Jill Neate, High Asia: An Illustrated History of the 7000 Metre Peaks,  
 Andy Fanshawe and Stephen Venables, Himalaya Alpine-Style, Hodder and Stoughton, 1995.
 Koichiro Ohmori, Over the Himalaya. Cloudcap/The Mountaineers, 1994.
 American Alpine Journal
 Himalayan Index
 DEM files for the Himalaya (Corrected versions of SRTM data)
 Tibet Ultra-Prominences on peaklist.org
 

Mountains of Tibet
Seven-thousanders of the Himalayas